Gerald Joseph Higgins (August 29, 1909 – December 20, 1996) was a highly decorated officer in the United States Army with the rank of major general. During the Second World War, he served consecutively as the Chief of Staff and Assistant Division Commander, 101st Airborne Division, making him the youngest general officer in the Army Ground Forces at the age of 34.

He began his career as an enlisted man, ultimately received an appointment to the United States Military Academy and completed his career as a major general and commander of the 82nd Airborne Division in 1955.

Early career

Gerald J. Higgins was born on August 29, 1909 in Chicago, Illinois, the son of William Francis Higgins and Martha Martin. Following his graduation from high school in summer 1927, he enlisted in the United States Army as a private and was attached to the 1st Battalion, 35th Infantry Regiment at Schofield Barracks, Hawaii. Higgins rose to the rank of sergeant and received an appointment to the United States Military Academy at West Point, New York in June 1930.

He graduated with a Bachelor of Science degree on June 12, 1934, and was commissioned a second lieutenant in the Infantry Branch. Higgins served with various infantry units until July 1938, when he entered the Army Infantry School at Fort Benning, Georgia in July 1938. He was meanwhile promoted to first lieutenant on June 12, 1937.

Upon the completion of the Infantry Officer Advanced Course in June 1939, Higgins entered Advanced Communications Officers' Course at Fort Benning and upon completion in June 1940, he was promoted to captain on October 7, 1940.

World War II

Following the United States entry into World War II, Higgins was promoted to major on February 1, 1942 and to lieutenant colonel on October 1 that year. He then joined newly activated 501st Parachute Infantry Regiment at Camp Toccoa, Georgia, which was part of the 101st Airborne Division under Major General William C. Lee. Higgins participated in the early regimental training at Camp Toccoa until August 1942 when he joined General Lee's divisional headquarters as Assistant Chief of Staff for Operations (G-3).

Higgins was appointed Divisional Chief of Staff in March 1943 and promoted to colonel on June 1, 1943. He deployed with the division to England in January 1944 and spent next five months in intensive ground training. Meanwhile, Major General Lee was relieved of command for reasons of ill health and was succeeded by Maxwell D. Taylor. The 101st Division participated in the Operation Overlord on June 6, 1944, during which the Assistant Division Commander, Brigadier General Don Pratt, was killed in a glider accident while taking part in the landing.

General Taylor chose Higgins as Pratt's replacement, and promoted him to the temporary rank of brigadier general on August 1, 1944, making him the youngest general officer in the Army Ground Forces at the age of 34. Higgins took part in the Operation Market Garden during September 1944, the Ardennes operations in winter 1944/1945, and finished his tenure with the 101st Airborne Division in the Bavarian Alps. He and General Taylor accepted the surrender of German field marshal Albert Kesselring and subsequently participated in the occupation duties in Germany.

For his service with the 101st Airborne Division, Higgins was decorated with the Silver Star, Legion of Merit and the Bronze Star Medal. He was also decorated by the Allies, and received numerous decorations including the Legion of Honour, French Croix de Guerre with Palm, Belgian Order of the Crown, Belgian Croix de Guerre with Palm and the Dutch Order of Orange-Nassau.

Postwar service

Higgins returned to the United States in August 1945 and assumed command of the Army Airborne School at Fort Benning, Georgia. He was responsible for the training of Army paratroopers until the end of January 1946, when he was ordered to the United States Military Academy at West Point, New York for duty as Commandant of Cadets.

He remained in that capacity until June 1948, when he embarked for Japan and joined the 24th Infantry Division under Major General Albert C. Smith as Assistant Commanding General. The Division was stationed on Kyushu and maintained order during occupation duties. Higgins was ordered back to the United States in October 1949 and joined the headquarters, 4th Infantry Division at Fort Ord, California.

Higgins participated with the division in the training of new recruits until late 1950, when he was ordered to Washington, D.C. for duty as Chief of the Organization & Training Division, Office of the Assistant Chief of Staff for Operations (G-3). He was promoted to major general in September 1952, and assumed command of the 82nd Airborne Division at Fort Bragg, North Carolina.

Retirement

Higgins retired from the Army in 1955, and settled in California. He then worked as an assistant on military matters for the president of the American Latex Products Corporation of Hawthorne, California and the Dayton Rubber Co., Dayton, Ohio. He also later worked in the management of Piasecki Aircraft.

Major General Gerald J. Higgins died on December 20, 1996, aged 87, in Riverside, California. He was married to Mary Elizabeth Roach of Chicago, and together they had two children: Robert and Patricia.

Decorations

Here is the ribbon bar of Major General Gerald J. Higgins:

References

External links

Generals of World War II

1909 births
1996 deaths
United States Army Infantry Branch personnel
Military personnel from Chicago
United States Military Academy alumni
United States Military Academy faculty
Recipients of the Silver Star
Recipients of the Legion of Merit
Chevaliers of the Légion d'honneur
Recipients of the Croix de Guerre 1939–1945 (France)
Recipients of the Croix de guerre (Belgium)
Officers of the Order of Orange-Nassau
United States Army generals of World War II
United States Army generals